The MAZ-543/MAZ-7310 "Uragan" (/Hurricane) is a Soviet/Belarusian 8×8 artillery truck designed and developed by MAZ (Minsk Automobile Plant), in what is now Belarus.

MAZ-543 

Designed in the 1960s, the MAZ-543 was presented on 7 November 1965 during the Moscow Red Square military parade as part of SS-1с Scud B (9K72 Elbrus) system. The vehicle is powered by a 38.9 litre D12A-525 tank diesel engine producing around 525 horsepower, and gives a maximum road speed of 37 mph (60 km/h).
There have been a number of variants.

MAZ-543A 

The 1967 MAZ-543A, arrived (with extra carrying capacity up to 22000 kg). 

The MAZ-7310 could operate together with 4WD MAZ-8385 trailer as a road-train (total length - 205.5 m) for oil surveying,. It was used in Siberia and also as a tractor on military airbases.

MAZ-543M 

The MAZ-543M version was designed to carry the BM-30 Smerch Multiple rocket launcher.

MAZ-543P 

The MAZ-543P (carrying capacity - 19600 kg) was used for 9K76 Temp-S system.

MAZ-547 

The MAZ-547 version is a six-axle version, used as Transporter erector launcher for the RSD-10 Pioneer.

MAZ-7910 

This variant is used to carry the air defense missile complex S-300PMU-2.

MAZ-74106 

This variant is used mainly to transport the air search radar  64N6 BIG BIRD for the S-300PM.

WS2400 

In 1986, People's Republic of China fielded its version of MAZ-543. Initially designated WS580 but later renamed WS2400, this Chinese version is one of the Wanshan series trucks  manufactured by Wanshan Special Vehicle, a wholly owned subsidiary of China Aerospace Sanjiang Space Co. Ltd., which is in turn a subsidiary of China Aerospace Science and Industry Corporation (CASIC). The advantage of the Chinese vehicle is that it utilizes a German diesel engine, transmission and hydraulics manufactured by Wanshan in China, built using technologies transferred from ZF Friedrichshafen.

See also 
 ZIL-135
 MAZ-7917
 TA580/TAS5380
 WS2400
 HEMTT

References

External links

 MAZ-543 at military-today.com

7310
Military trucks of the Soviet Union
Wheeled self-propelled rocket launchers
Military vehicles introduced in the 1960s
Military vehicles of Belarus